Peter Wirnsberger (born 13 September 1958) is an Austrian former alpine skier who won 8 races in World Cup.

Achievements

See also
 Men's Downhill Small Crystal Globe podiums

References

External links
 
 
 
 

1958 births
Living people
Austrian male alpine skiers
Olympic alpine skiers of Austria
Olympic silver medalists for Austria
Alpine skiers at the 1980 Winter Olympics
Olympic medalists in alpine skiing
FIS Alpine Ski World Cup champions
Medalists at the 1980 Winter Olympics
Recipients of the Decoration of Honour for Services to the Republic of Austria